Air Commodore Pamela Joy Tamblin  (11 January 1926 – 8 March 2015) was a senior officer of the Royal Air Force. She served as Director of the Women's Royal Air Force from 1976 to 1980.

Military career
During World War II, Tamblin served in the Auxiliary Territorial Service. She worked at Bletchley Park between 1943 and 1945.

She joined the Women's Royal Air Force in 1951. She served in the Education Branch from 1951 to 1955, and the Administrative Branch from 1955 to 1976. She was station commander of RAF Spitalgate from 1971 to 1974. She served as Director of the Women's Royal Air Force from 1976 to 1980.

Tamblin decided to study at Durham University, resulting in a Secondary Honours Degree in “Geography and Economics”, this decision was taken after Tamblin was “discharged at the rank of Corporal”. Shortly afterwards, Tamblin managed an education centre and then went on to the administrative branch in 1955, resulting in “personnel and general management”. 
In 1951, she joined the RAF and began her training for 12 weeks into becoming an officer.
Tamblin developed her skills as an “interviewer, projectionist and public speaker and adding to this also learned how to manage accounts”.
Tamblin had many different responsibilities, which is still a rare situation for a woman to be in, even today.

Honours
In the 1980 Queen's Birthday Honours, Tamblin was appointed Companion of the Order of the Bath (CB).

Death
Joy Tamblin died on 8 March 2015 in Cornwall, aged 89, having been predeceased by her husband, Douglas.

References

 

 
 
 

1926 births
2015 deaths
Women's Royal Air Force officers
Auxiliary Territorial Service officers
Bletchley Park people
Companions of the Order of the Bath
Place of birth missing
Bletchley Park women
Alumni of Durham University